SS-Sturmbannführer Herman Brunner is a recurrent supporting character from the Polish popular TV series More Than Life at Stake (Stawka większa niż życie). He is played by Emil Karewicz.

Biography 
A Sicherheitsdienst (sometimes incorrectly linked to Gestapo) officer in occupied Poland during World War II, Brunner is a ruthless Nazi official, who sometimes works with main character, Lieutenant (later Captain) Hans Kloss of Abwehr, who is really Major Stanislaw Kolicki of Polish intelligence. Brunner looks after his own interests and is not a fanatic. (Near end of the war he tries to kidnap a renowned German professor, a specialist in rocket technology, in order to sell him to the western allies in exchange for his own safety and other benefits). Nothing is known about his background.

Although he appeared in just 5 of 18 episodes, Brunner became as popular a character as Kloss, sometimes even more popular. Despite his multiple sinister acts (in addition to his work in a repressive regime, he was also involved in an armed robbery, which left the wife of a high ranking NSDAP official dead), Brunner in part was a likeable character, due to his rascal-like sense of humor, and his lack of obvious involvement in violence on screen.

Many of Brunner's lines in the series are still widely known and quoted in Poland, for example:
 I hate to watch a man being beaten... unless I am beating him myself.
 Hello Hans, I knew I would find you here.
 Remember I'm always your friend, Hans.
 Brunner senses women and alcohol from a kilometer away.

Fictional Nazis
Fictional criminals
Characters in pulp fiction